Le Ton beau de Marot: In Praise of the Music of Language is a 1997 book by Douglas Hofstadter in which he explores the meaning, strengths, failings and beauty of translation. The book is a long and detailed examination of one short translation of a minor French poem and, through that, an examination of the mysteries of translation (and indeed more generally, language and consciousness) itself.  Hofstadter himself refers to it as "my ruminations on the art of translation".

The title itself is a pun, revealing many of the themes of the work: le ton beau means ‘the beautiful tone’ or ‘the sweet tone’, but the word order is unusual for French. It would be more common to write le beau ton. A French speaker hearing the title spoken would be more likely to interpret it as le tombeau de Marot; where tombeau may mean ‘tomb’ (as per the cover picture), but also tombeau, ‘a work of art (literature or music) done in memory and homage to a deceased person’ (the title is intended to parallel the title of Maurice Ravel's Le Tombeau de Couperin). In a further play on the title, Hofstadter refers to his deceased wife Carol, to whom the book is dedicated, as ma rose ("my rose"), and to himself as ton beau ("your dear").

At the surface level, the book treats the difficulties and rewards of translating works (particularly poetry) from one language to another. Diverse translations (usually to English) of a short poem in Renaissance French, Clément Marot's A une Damoyselle malade (referred to as ‘Ma mignonne’ by Hofstadter), serve as reference points for his ideas on the subject. Groups of translations alternate with analysis and commentary on the same throughout the book. However, Hofstadter's reading of the idea of ‘translation’ goes deeper than simply that of translating between languages. Translation between frames of reference — languages, cultures, modes of expression or, indeed, between one person's thoughts and another — becomes an element in many of the same concepts Hofstadter has addressed in prior works, such as reference and self-reference, structure and function, and artificial intelligence.

One theme of this book is the loss of Hofstadter's wife Carol, who died of a brain tumor while the book was being written; she also created one of the numerous translations of Marot's poem presented in the book. In this context the poem, dedicated to ‘a sick lady’, gained yet another deeply tragic and personal meaning, even though the translations were started long before her illness was even known (Hofstadter went on to follow with an even more personal book titled I Am a Strange Loop after the death of his wife).

See also
 Translation studies
 Machine translation
 On Translating Beowulf

References

External links
 Site with complete works of Marot, plus many other French poets

1997 non-fiction books
Linguistics books
Philosophy books
Cognitive science literature
Books by Douglas Hofstadter
Basic Books books
Translation publications